The Men's 4 x 100 metre freestyle relay event at the 2013 Southeast Asian Games took place on 14 December 2013 at Wunna Theikdi Aquatics Centre.

There were 6 teams who took part in this event. Singapore won the gold medal, Malaysia and Thailand won the silver and bronze medal respectively.

Schedule
All times are Myanmar Standard Time (UTC+06:30)

Records

Results

References

External links

Swimming at the 2013 Southeast Asian Games